Wyoming Centennial Scenic Byway is a scenic byway that exists in Sublette, Teton, and Fremont counties in the U.S. state of Wyoming and extends from Pinedale, Wyoming for  to Dubois, Wyoming.

Route description
The scenic byway passes through both Shoshone and Bridger-Teton National Forests as well as Grand Teton National Park. Jackson, Wyoming is the largest town on the route which also borders the National Elk Refuge in Jackson Hole. Crossing the continental Divide at Togwotee Pass, sweeping vistas of the Absaroka and Teton Ranges are plentiful. The scenic road follows parts of U.S. Route 26 (US 26) and US 189.

Following in the footsteps of famous mountain men such as John Colter and David Edward Jackson, the Wyoming Centennial Scenic Byway provides access to sagebrush-covered plains and dense coniferous forests.

Major intersections

See also

References

External links
 
 Centennial Scenic Byway on Wyoming Tourism
 Wyoming Centennial Scenic Byway on USDS Forest Service's website

Shoshone National Forest
Bridger–Teton National Forest
Grand Teton National Park
Roads in Wyoming
National Forest Scenic Byways
Transportation in Sublette County, Wyoming
Tourist attractions in Sublette County, Wyoming
Transportation in Teton County, Wyoming
Tourist attractions in Teton County, Wyoming
Transportation in Fremont County, Wyoming
Tourist attractions in Fremont County, Wyoming
Scenic highways in the United States
Jackson, Wyoming
Jackson, Wyoming micropolitan area
U.S. Route 26